Barisone II (died 1203) was the Judge of Gallura from about 1170 to his death. He was the son of Constantine III. His name appears in acts of 1182 and 1184.

He was married to Elena de Lacon and had a daughter named Elena who inherited Gallura. Barisone commended his judgeship to Pope Innocent III before he died, so as to protect his daughter's inheritance. He was probably looking at Innocent's succession protecting the rights of Constance and Frederick I of Sicily. There was a conflict in Sardinia following his death in 1203 as various powers sought the marriage of Elena to establish control over Gallura.

Notes

1203 deaths
Judges (judikes) of Gallura
Year of birth unknown